Pylene was a town of ancient Aetolia, between the Acheolous and the Evenus, mentioned in Homer's Catalogue of Ships in the Iliad, is placed by Pliny the Elder on the Corinthian Gulf. It would therefore seem to have existed in later times; although Strabo says that the Aetolians, having removed Pylene higher up, changed its name into Proschium.

Its site is tentatively located near the modern Magoula/Aitolikon.

References

Populated places in ancient Aetolia
Former populated places in Greece
Locations in the Iliad